Velour Recordings is an American record label founded in 1999 in New York City by Jeff Krasno and Sean Hoess.

Signed artists include
 The Cat Empire
 Soulive
 Kaki King
 Melissa Errico
 Maktub
 Topaz
 Lettuce
 Kudu
 Baba
 Sonya Kitchell
 Rustic Overtones
 Beowulf Sheehan
 Brendan James
 Jesse Harris
 Krystle Warren
 Rufus Cappadocia
 Ryan Scott

See also
 List of record labels

American record labels
Record labels established in 1999
Rock record labels
Pop record labels
1999 establishments in New York City